Lokpeng is a  village located in Pangin town  of Siang district ( earlier East Siang district ) of Arunachal Pradesh  in India.

As per Population Census 2011, in the village there are total 48 families with population of 191 and with 94 males and 97 females.

References

Villages in Siang district